Youhanna Nueir (born 28 August 1914 in Faiyum) was an Egyptian clergyman and the former suffragan eparch of Asyut. He was ordained in 1943, appointed in 1965, and died in 1995.

References 

Coptic Catholic bishops
1914 births
1995 deaths